The  is a common entrance examination for Japanese universities, which was introduced in 2021 in place of the National Center Test for University Admissions.  This is carried out by the National Center for University Entrance Examinations (DNC).

References 

Entrance examinations
Testing and exams in Japan
Standardized tests
2021 establishments in Japan